Central Railroad of New Jersey No. 113, also known as CNJ No. 113, is an 0-6-0 "Switcher" type steam locomotive originally built in June of 1923 by the American Locomotive Company (ALCO) for the Central Railroad of New Jersey. The locomotive was designed solely for yard service and could only operate at slow speeds due to the locomotive not having any leading or trailing wheels, but only six driving wheels (thus the 0-6-0 wheel arrangement). No. 113 currently performs passenger excursion services and some freight assignments on Reading Blue Mountain & Northern operated tracks. It is owned and operated by the Railway Restoration Project 113 Organization out of Minersville, PA.

History

Revenue service 
CNJ No. 113 was built in June 1923 by the American Locomotive Company. It was one of five B-7 type switchers built for the Central Railroad of New Jersey, numbers 111–115. These locomotives were designed to operate on the Anthracite Roads of Pennsylvania, so instead of having regular fireboxes, they had Wootten fireboxes which allowed them to burn anthracite coal. Since these locomotives were designed with a 0-6-0 wheel arrangement, their only effective use was to be operated as switchers since they did not ride smoothly and rarely got past 15 miles per hour. No. 113 along with its counterparts operated in the CNJ's freight yards for almost three decades. In 1945, the railroad had changed their class to 6S46 (6-wheeled Switcher, 46,000 pounds tractive effort). By 1951, locomotives 111-115 were placed out of service in favor of the new diesel locomotives.

Change in Ownership 
Around 1953, the Philadelphia & Reading Coal & Iron Company, now the Reading Anthracite Co., bought No. 113 and used the engine at a colliery in Locust Summit outside Ashland, Pennsylvania until it was last used in 1960. It became the last CNJ steam engine to be steamed up. No. 113 also ran a few fan trips with CNJ No. 774 in 1954, but 774 was soon scrapped. 113 was then stored outside at Locust Summit for many years and as a result, suffered a massive amount of deterioration and there were even some trees growing around the locomotive. The Philadelphia & Reading Coal & Iron Company eventually decided to donate No. 113 to the Historic Red Clay Valley Inc. (located in Wilmington, Delaware) in 1980. In 1986, the locomotive was purchased by Robert E. Kimmel Sr. and was later moved to Minersville.

Restoration 
Work to restore the locomotive to operating condition began in 1999 and it took more than twenty years for it to fully be operational again. The total cost to restore the engine was more than $600,000 and had countless hours of volunteer labor. No. 113 was also restored with minimal protection from the elements and no heavy machinery. Many of the parts on the locomotive had long been missing before the restoration had even started. As a result, many of the parts had to be made from scratch since there had not been any commercial builders that produced parts for steam locomotives in decades. One example is how the volunteers had to make a wooden cast of the original three-chime whistle by measuring an original CNJ whistle which was available to them. The engine was finally fired up after more than five decades of inactivity on November 23, 2012. The Railway Restoration Project 113 Organization conducted a test-run on the same day with the engine also doing some more test-runs in 2013 and 2014.

Excursion service 
After the test-runs for the engine in late 2012 and two/thirds of 2013, the locomotive began operating on some passenger excursions in late 2013 with Reading Blue Mountain & Northern Railroad No. 425. CNJ No. 113 continued to run more excursions by itself and with RBM&N No. 425 during the 2014 season. Every year since then, the No. 113 has been hauling excursions across the RBM&NR's lines in cooperation with the railroad. For the excursions, the Reading Blue Mountain & Northern Railroad provides passenger cars and occasionally some helper locomotives to Railway Restoration Project 113 in order for the excursions to occur. No. 113 happens to be the only surviving CNJ steam locomotive that is still operational. There is only one other CNJ steam locomotive still in existence and that is CNJ No. 592; however it is not operational and it currently resides at the Baltimore & Ohio Railroad Museum. Currently, No. 113 operates out of Minersville, PA at the Minersville Train Depot hauling multiple excursions each year.

See also 

 Central Railroad of New Jersey

References

External links 

 Railway Restoration Project 113's Homepage
 Railroad Pictures Archive: CNJ 113
CNJ No. 592

0-6-0 locomotives
ALCO locomotives
Individual locomotives of the United States
Steam locomotives of the United States
Standard gauge locomotives of the United States
Railway locomotives introduced in 1923
Preserved steam locomotives of Pennsylvania